Tamask (also known as Tamask-e Pā’īn) is a village in Dasht-e Sar Rural District, Dabudasht District, Amol County, Mazandaran Province, Iran. At the 2006 census, its population was 944, in 265 families.

References 

Populated places in Amol County